Jongjasan  is a mountain near the city of Pocheon, Gyeonggi-do in South Korea.

See also
 List of mountains in Korea

Notes

References
 

Mountains of Gyeonggi Province
Pocheon
Yeoncheon County
Mountains of South Korea